Phitsanulok Mansion or formerly known Banthomsinth House ( lit: House of the Sleeping Narayana) is the official residence of the Prime Minister of Thailand, located not far to the east from the government house in Dusit, Bangkok. The mansion was originally built at the behest of King Rama VI was and given to his aide-de-camp, .

History 
The high cost of maintenance forced Lord Aniruth-deva to offer the mansion to King Rama VII, which he refused. During the Second World War, the Japanese government wanted to buy the mansion and use it as an embassy. However because the mansion is located in such an important strategic area, the Thai government decided to buy the mansion and use it as a state guest house instead. Later it was decided that it should become an official residence of the Prime Minister of Thailand. The Prime minister works nearby at the Government House. The mansion is maintained by the Office of the Prime Minister, a government agency of the Royal Thai Government.

Only two prime ministers, Prem Tinsulanonda and Chuan Leekpai, have taken residence there.  Prem moved to another premise after a few days. The house is reportedly haunted.

Gallery

See also
 Government House (Thailand)
 Mario Tamagno
 Official residence

References 

Official residences in Thailand
Buildings and structures in Bangkok
Unregistered ancient monuments in Bangkok
Prime ministerial residences
1922 architecture
Reportedly haunted locations